Gotta Get That Feeling is a song by Bruce Springsteen from the 2010 outtakes compilation album The Promise.
A two-song limited edition 10-inch 45-rpm vinyl single "Gotta Get That Feeling" / "Racing in the Street '78 (Live from the Carousel, Asbury Park)", consisted of the two live versions of the tracks from The Promise, and was released on April 16, 2011 exclusively for Record Store Day.

The performances captured were recorded on December 7, 2010 at The Carousel in Asbury Park, New Jersey and feature the last E Street Band performances by Clarence Clemons, who died in June 2011.

Track listing
"Gotta Get That Feeling"
"Racing in the Street ('78)"

Personnel

The E Street Band
 Bruce Springsteen – lead vocals, lead guitar, harmonica
 Roy Bittan – piano, vocals
 Clarence Clemons – saxophone, vocals
 Charles Giordano – organ, glockenspiel
 Garry Tallent – bass guitar
 Steve Van Zandt – rhythm guitar, vocals
 Max Weinberg – drums

References

External links
 Bruce Springsteen official website

2011 singles
Record Store Day releases
Bruce Springsteen
2010 songs
Songs written by Bruce Springsteen
Bruce Springsteen songs